Hossein Mohyeddin Ghomshei (born 4 January 1940) better known as Elahi Ghomshei, is an Iranian scholar, philosopher, author, and lecturer on literature, art, and mysticism.

Life and education
Ghomshei was born on 4 January 1940 in Tehran, Iran. He is the son of Mehdi Elahi Ghomshei, the famous translator of Quran into Persian. He received his PhD in Islamic Theology and Philosophy from the University of Tehran.

Traditional education
 Arabic literature, grammar, logic, theosophy, jurisprudence, and Kalam: Tehran Seminary School
 Persian literature: especially Nezami, Rumi, Hafez, Saadi and Attar
 Islamic mysticism: especially Ibn-al-Arabi and Ibn-al-Farez
 Philosophy of the fine arts

Academic work

Lectureship
Ghomshei was a lecturer at Tehran University and other universities and institutes (1968–2000) in the fields of:
 Philosophy
 Philosophy of the fine arts (aesthetics)
 Persian literature and mysticism
 Theology and Islamic mysticism
 English literature (emphasis on Shakespeare)
 Works of Rumi, Saadi, Hafez, Attar, Nezami, Ferdowsi, Shabestari.

Other academic works
Ghomshei has been: 
 an international guest lecturer (partial list below)
 a domestic lecturer at various locations
 an author and translator (partial list below)
 the Director, National Library of Iran (1981-2)
 a culture and art adviser
 an editor

International lecture sites (partial list)
	England
Victoria & Albert Museum, London
Dartington Hall, Devon
Cambridge University
Oxford University
Temenos Academy, London
University of Exeter
SOAS, University of London
Imperial College, University of London
University College of London
	Scotland
University of Glasgow
	United States of America
University of California, Berkeley
University of California, Los Angeles
University of Southern California (USC)
California State University, Long Beach
University of George Town
Harvard University
Princeton University
Stanford University
	Australia
University of Melbourne
Macquarie University, Sydney
Monash University
University of Queensland
	Canada
University of British Columbia
Simon Fraser University
University of Toronto
	Austria
Goethe Institute
Vienna University
	France
Versaille Palaces
	Germany
Frankfurt Book Fair

Awards

 Most popular TV personality, highest ever rating at 86% (1998-9)

Books

 	Selection from the Discourses of Rumi (Fihe-ma-Fih). 1987. Elmi-Farhangi Publications Co.
 	Selection from the Conference of Birds (Mantiq-al-Tayr) by Attar. 1994. Elmi-Farhangi Publications Co.
 	Divan Hafez (A Critical edition of Hafez's Collected Poems). 2003. Peik-e-Oloum Publication.
 	Essays on Persian Mystical Literature. Poetics and Aesthetics. 1999. Rowzaneh Publications Co.
 	Kimia ; Collected Essays, Translations and Introductions (Vol.1-5,8-12): 1998–2016. Rowzaneh Publications Co.
 	Introduction to Golshan-e-Raz (Sheikh Mahmoud Shabestari). 1998. Elmi-Farhangi Publications Co.
 	A Study of Islamic Texts in English Translation (University Textbook). 1992. SAMT Publication.
 	Selection of Quotations and Poems by Shakespeare (translation). 2003. Elmi-Farhangi Publications Co.
 	The Prophet (Translation from Gibran Khalil). 1999. Rowzaneh Publications Co.
 	In the Realm of Saadi: A Collection of 365 Poems and Discourses from Saadi (Introduction and Commentaries). 2002. Sokhan Publishers.
 	Omar Khayyam Robaiiats (Preface, editor). 2003. Peik-e-Oloum Publication.
 	Selection From Shahnameh by Ferdowsi. 2006. Peik-e-Oloum Publication. 
 	Invocations of Komail (Translation from Emam Ali). 2006. Yassavoli Publications.
 	Cultural Symposium. 2007. Peik-e-Oloum Publication.
 	In the Realm of Gold: A Collection of 365 Poems and Passages from English Literature (Selection,Translation and Commentaries). 2007. Sokhan Publishers.
 	In the Realm of Rumi: A Collection of 365 Poems and Discourses from Rumi (Introduction and Commentaries). 2009. Sokhan Publishers.
 	The Other Wise Man (Translation from Henry van Dyke). 2007. Rowzaneh Publications Co.
 	Subtleties of Mulla Nasreddin (Introduction and notes). 2010. Rowzaneh Publications Co.
 	In the Realm of the Quran: A Collection of 365 Passages from Quran (Selection, Persian Translation, Commentaries and Introduction). 2011. Sokhan Publishers.
 	A Treasury of the Familiar: 365 Days with the Persian Poetry, (Selection, Commentaries and Introduction). 2013. Sokhan Publishers.
 	Rubaiyat of Omar Khayyam (Introduction and Commentaries on 40 Quatrains). 2015. Mirdashti Publication.
 	Mystical Passages from Early Persian Prose and Poetry .2016. SAMT Publication.
       In the Realm of Hafez: A collection of 365 poems from Hafez (Introduction and Commentaries). 2017. Sokhan Publishers.
       The Laments of Baba Tahir: The Mystic Saint and Poet of Early Persian Literature (Persian Introduction and Edition). 2018. Gooya House of Culture and Art.
The Grace of Quran: Album of  Quranic Calligraphy, (Selection and Translation). 2018. Sabzeh Publishers.
The Song of Lovers: A Selection of Elahi Ghomshei's Divan, ( Selection, Edition, and Introduction). 2018. Sokhan Publishers. 
The Divan of Hafiz (Persian Introduction and Edition). 2019. Gooya House of Culture and Art.

Articles in English
Hossein Elahi Ghomshei. Remembrance of the friend- Alast: man's divine covenant in Islam and Persian Literature.
 Hossein Elahi Ghomshei. The Principles of the Religion of Love in Classical Persian Poetry
 Hossein Elahi Ghomshei. The Symphony of Rumi. In the Philosophy of Ecstasy: Rumi and the Sufi Tradition. 2014.
 Hossein Elahi Ghomshei. Hafez & the Divine Covenant
 Hossein Elahi Ghomshei. Of Scent and Sweetness: Attar's Legacy in Rumi, Shabestari and Hafez
 Hossein Elahi Ghomshei. The Rose and the Nightingale: the Role of Poetry in Persian Culture
 Hossein Elahi Ghomshei. Poetics & Aesthetics in the Persian Sufi Literary Tradition
Leonard Lewisohn. In the Company of the Quran by Muhyal-Din Ilahi Ghomshei.
Hossein Elahi Ghomshei. Crossing the Bar: Leonard Lewisohn.

Lecture topics in English (partial list)
	Seven Tales under Seven Domes; by Nezami
	Attar : Seven Stations of Love
	An Aesthetic Approach to the Philosophical Theory of Substantial Motion
	Problems of the Predestination and Free Will
	Saadi & Shakespeare (A comparative study)
	Rose & Nightingale; An Introduction to Persian Literature and Mysticism
	Music in Persian Poetry
	Rumi : The Art and Wisdom of Storytelling in Mathnavi
	Hafez and His Works
	Cultural Investment for the Younger Generation
	The World of Happiness and How to Attain it
	Poetics and Aesthetics in Persian Literature
	Adventures in Persian Mysticism
	Mathnavi : A Book for All Ages
	Nasir Khosrow's Poetry
	Mohyeddin Arabi and Ebn-e- Farez
	An Evening with Hafez
	Ethics of Science and Technology
	The Quran in Persian Literature
	The Wine of Alast: Divine Covenant of Man with God
	One and Many : The Circle of Being
	Global Ethics and the Human Nature
	Immortality of Soul
	Poetry and Prophecy
	Rumi: The Messenger of Love
	Islam and Human Nature
	Philosophical Doctrines and Spiritual Teachings of Rumi
	Alchemy of Love
	The Religion of Love in Classical Persian Poetry
	The Veils of God
	Total Integration of Man
	Perpetual Conflict between Man & Demon
	The Symphony of Rumi: A Thematic Approach to Rumi's Poetry
	A Philosophical and Aesthetic Approach to the Laws of Harmony
	The Wisdom of the Heart in Ibn Arabi and Persian Mystic Literature
	The True Essence of Islam
	Islamic Mystical Bacchanalia: The Wine-Ode of Ibn Farid of Egypt
       The Mythology of Norouz in Persian Literature
       Rumi and Tagore on Love
       Denizens of the Realm of Gold: A Sojourn among Some Immortal Mediaeval Persian Poets
       On Mahmud Shabistari
       On Rumi

Lectures in Persian
Dr Elahi Ghomshei has delivered over 500 lectures in Persian in the past 40 years at different universities  and cultural centers. Some lectures were broadcast on the Iranian TV Channel and they are also available in some social media websites. Elahi Ghomshei Culture and Art Institute has a complete collection of his lectures in their archive. Some of the lectures published on CDs are as follows**            
 Excursions on Literature, Art, and Mysticism (72 lectures)
 In the Company of Hafiz (32 lectures)
 Divine Wine of Ibne Fariz of Egypt (5 lectures)
 Baghe-e-Del, on Shabestari's Golshane-Raz (24 lectures)
 The Epic of Man: On Nezami (10 lectures)
 The Evergreen Gardens of Saadi (10 lectures)
A Roaming in the Sonnets of Shakespeare (5 lectures)

Other activities
 Chairman of the Board, Elahi Ghomshei Culture & Art Institute, Tehran
 Member of the Board, Mawlana Jalaledin Rumi Culture,Art,Research Institute, Tehran
 Chief Editor.Chaleepa Quarterly Magazine, Calligraphy &Traditional Arts, Tehran
 Fellow of the Temenos Academy, London
 Member of the Advisory Council, Mawlana Rumi Review, London

See also
 Rumi
 Esmaeel Azar
 Iranian humanitarians
 Intellectual movements in Iran

References

External links

 Official website

1940 births
University of Tehran
Living people
Researchers of Persian literature
Faculty of Theology and Islamic Studies of the University of Tehran alumni
Heads of the National Library of Iran
Iranian male writers
Mysticism scholars